Order of Ancient Maccabeans (also Maccabaeans) is an Anglo-Jewish society. The order is a friendly society established in 1894, and registered on 8 May 1901, under the Friendly Societies' Act, as amended 1896.

History
When Theodor Herzl came to England before the First Zionist Congress the members of the Society, who then belonged to the "Lovers of Zion" movement, pledged their adherence to the Zionist cause. The Society was an avowedly Zionist Order, and every member on admission had to declare his willingness to be a Zionist, to pay the shekel and to assist generally through the Order in the work of resettling the Jews in Palestine. Membership consists primarily of people in the professions, with aims to provide "social intercourse and co-operation among its members with a view to the promotion of the interests of Jews, including the support of any professional or learned bodies and charities."

All persons "of the Jewish faith who declare themselves adherents to the Zionist Movement" can become members; membership also includes similarly minded, non-Jewish 'honorary' members.

Past presidents

 1891–1903 Raphael Meldola (in whose honour the society awards the Meldola medal for Chemistry)
 1903–04 Albert Goldsmid
 1904–27 Solomon Joseph Solomon
 1927–32 Herbert Bentwich
 1932–54 Selig Brodetsky
 1982–90 Sir Alan Marre
 1990–2000 Sir John Balcombe
 2000–present Sir Ian Gainsford

Other notable members have included:

 Louis Barnett Abrahams
 Chief Rabbi Hermann Adler
 Norman Bentwich
 Sir Ernst Boris Chain
 Marcus Hartog
 Rev. Morris Joseph
 Chief Rabbi Joseph H. Hertz
 Waldemar Haffkine
 Sir Ian Heilbron
 Sir Bernard Rix
 Charles Kensington Salaman
 Isaac Snowman
 Rev. Joseph Stern
 Rev. Charles Voysey (Not Jewish; hon. member)
 Chaim Weizmann
 Lucien Wolf
 Israel Zangwill

References

Further reading
 Encyclopaedia Judaica, art. Maccabaeans
 Jewish Year Book, 2005, p. 104
 Who was Who

Charities based in England
Jewish charities based in the United Kingdom
Jewish clubs and societies
Jews and Judaism in England
Zionism in the United Kingdom
Zionist organizations